The Landmark Theatre is a theatre in the North Devon coastal town of Ilfracombe. Of unusual double conical design, it is locally referred to as Madonna's Bra, a reference to its shape and that of an iconic bra worn by the singer Madonna. It was built to replace The Pavilion Theatre, a Victorian building partly destroyed in a fire during the 1980s and later demolished. This theatre, along with the Queen's Theatre, Barnstaple, is managed by the North Devon Theatres' Trust, a registered charity  promoting the arts, including dance, drama, literature, music and song, in North Devon.

On Monday 23 January 2017, it was announced that North Devon Theatres Trust had gone into administration. Parkwood Theatres were appointed as a temporary operator until the end of March 2018.

On Friday 23 November 2018, it was announced that Selladoor Worldwide had been awarded a 10 Year Contract to manage the venue.

References

External links
North Devon Theatres Trust

Theatres in Devon
Ilfracombe
Buildings and structures in Ilfracombe